Kakinada Town railway station (station code:CCT) is an Indian Railways station in Kakinada of Andhra Pradesh. It lies on Samalkot–Kakinada Port branch line of Howrah–Chennai main line and is administered under Vijayawada railway division of South Coast Railway zone (formerly South Central Railway zone).

Classification 
In terms of earnings and outward passengers handled, Kakinada Town is categorized as a Non-Suburban Grade-3 (NSG-3) railway station. Based on the re–categorization of Indian Railway stations for the period of 2017–18 and 2022–23, an NSG–3 category station earns between – crore and handles  passengers.

The station has been selected for the Adarsh Station Scheme, a scheme for upgradation of stations by the Indian Railways.

Originating express trains

Station amenities 

It is one of the 38 stations in the division to be equipped with Automatic Ticket Vending Machines (ATVMs).

See also
Kakinada Port railway station

References

Railway stations in East Godavari district
Transport in Kakinada
Railway junction stations in Andhra Pradesh